Nathabhai Hegolabhai Patel (born 1 January 1947) is an Indian politician from the state of Gujarat. He is a Member of the Legislative Assembly representing Dhanera (Vidhan Sabha constituency). He belongs to Indian National Congress party.

References

1947 births
Indian National Congress politicians from Gujarat
Living people